Hoplomachidea is a genus of plant bugs in the family Miridae. There is one described species in Hoplomachidea, H. consors.

References

Further reading

 
 
 

Phylinae
Articles created by Qbugbot